Tërpan is a village and a former municipality in Berat County, central Albania. At the 2015 local government reform it became a subdivision of the municipality Poliçan. The population at the 2011 census was 1,716.

References

Administrative units of Poliçan
Villages in Berat County